The following outline is provided as an overview of and topical guide to Saint Kitts and Nevis:

The Federation of Saint Kitts and Nevis, also known as Saint Christopher and Nevis, is a sovereign federal two-island nation located in the Leeward Islands in the Caribbean Sea. It is the smallest nation in the Americas, in both area and population.

The capital city and headquarters of government for the federated state is on the larger island of Saint Kitts. The smaller state of Nevis lies about 2 miles (3 km) southeast of Saint Kitts, across a shallow channel called "The Narrows".

Historically, the British dependency of Anguilla was also a part of this union, which was then known collectively as Saint Christopher-Nevis-Anguilla.

Saint Kitts and Nevis are geographically part of the Leeward Islands. To the north-northwest lie the islands of Sint Eustatius, Saba, Saint Barthélemy, and Saint-Martin/Sint Maarten. To the east and northeast are Antigua and Barbuda, and to the southeast is the small uninhabited island of Redonda, and the island of Montserrat, which currently has an active volcano (see Soufrière Hills.)

Saint Kitts and Nevis were amongst the first islands in the Caribbean to be settled by Europeans. Saint Kitts was home to the first British and French colonies in the Caribbean.

Saint Kitts and Nevis is the smallest nation on Earth to ever host a World Cup event; it was one of the host venues of the 2007 Cricket World Cup.

General reference 

 Pronunciation:
 Common English country names:  Saint Kitts and Nevis or Saint Christopher and Nevis
 Official English country names:  The Federation of Saint Kitts and Nevis or the Federation of Saint Christopher and Nevis
 Common endonym(s):  
 Official endonym(s):  
 Adjectival(s):
 Demonym(s):
 Etymology: Name of Saint Kitts and Nevis
 ISO country codes:  KN, KNA, 659
 ISO region codes:  See ISO 3166-2:KN
 Internet country code top-level domain:  .kn

Geography of Saint Kitts and Nevis 

Geography of Saint Kitts and Nevis
 Saint Kitts and Nevis are...
 a pair of islands
 a country
 an island country
 a nation state
 a Commonwealth realm
 Location:
 Northern Hemisphere and Western Hemisphere
 North America (off the East Coast of the United States, southeast of Puerto Rico)
 Atlantic Ocean
 Caribbean
 Antilles
 Lesser Antilles (island chain)
 Leeward Islands
 Time zone:  Eastern Caribbean Time (UTC-04)
 Extreme points of Saint Kitts and Nevis
 High:  Mount Liamuiga on Saint Kitts 
 Low:  Caribbean Sea 0 m
 Land boundaries:  none
 Coastline:  Caribbean Sea 135 km
 Population of Saint Kitts and Nevis: 50,000  – 201st most populous country

 Area of Saint Kitts and Nevis: 261
 Atlas of Saint Kitts and Nevis

Environment of Saint Kitts and Nevis 

 Climate of Saint Kitts and Nevis
 Renewable energy in Saint Kitts and Nevis
 Geology of Saint Kitts and Nevis
 Protected areas of Saint Kitts and Nevis
 Biosphere reserves in Saint Kitts and Nevis
 National parks of Saint Kitts and Nevis
 Wildlife of Saint Kitts and Nevis
 Fauna of Saint Kitts and Nevis
 Birds of Saint Kitts and Nevis
 Mammals of Saint Kitts and Nevis

Natural geographic features of Saint Kitts and Nevis 

 Fjords of Saint Kitts and Nevis
 Glaciers of Saint Kitts and Nevis
 Islands of Saint Kitts and Nevis
 Lakes of Saint Kitts and Nevis
 Mountains of Saint Kitts and Nevis
 Volcanoes in Saint Kitts and Nevis
 Rivers of Saint Kitts and Nevis
 Waterfalls of Saint Kitts and Nevis
 Valleys of Saint Kitts and Nevis
 World Heritage Sites in Saint Kitts and Nevis

Regions of Saint Kitts and Nevis 

Regions of Saint Kitts and Nevis

Ecoregions of Saint Kitts and Nevis 

List of ecoregions in Saint Kitts and Nevis
 Ecoregions in Saint Kitts and Nevis

Demography of Saint Kitts and Nevis 

Demographics of Saint Kitts and Nevis

Government and politics of Saint Kitts and Nevis 

Politics of Saint Kitts and Nevis
 Form of government:
 Capital of Saint Kitts and Nevis: Basseterre
 Elections in Saint Kitts and Nevis
 Political parties in Saint Kitts and Nevis

Branches of the government of Saint Kitts and Nevis 

Government of Saint Kitts and Nevis

Executive branch of the government of Saint Kitts and Nevis 
 Head of state: King of Saint Kitts and Nevis, King Charles III
 Head of government: Prime Minister of Saint Kitts and Nevis,
 Cabinet of Saint Kitts and Nevis

Legislative branch of the government of Saint Kitts and Nevis 

 Parliament of Saint Kitts and Nevis (bicameral)
 Upper house: Senate of Saint Kitts and Nevis
 Lower house: House of Commons of Saint Kitts and Nevis

Judicial branch of the government of Saint Kitts and Nevis 

Court system of Saint Kitts and Nevis
 Supreme Court of Saint Kitts and Nevis

Foreign relations of Saint Kitts and Nevis 

Foreign relations of Saint Kitts and Nevis
 Diplomatic missions in Saint Kitts and Nevis
 Diplomatic missions of Saint Kitts and Nevis

International organization membership 
The Federation of Saint Kitts and Nevis is a member of:

African, Caribbean, and Pacific Group of States (ACP)
Agency for the Prohibition of Nuclear Weapons in Latin America and the Caribbean (OPANAL)
Caribbean Community and Common Market (Caricom)
Caribbean Development Bank (CDB)
Commonwealth of Nations
Food and Agriculture Organization (FAO)
Group of 77 (G77)
International Bank for Reconstruction and Development (IBRD)
International Civil Aviation Organization (ICAO)
International Criminal Court (ICCt)
International Criminal Police Organization (Interpol)
International Development Association (IDA)
International Federation of Red Cross and Red Crescent Societies (IFRCS)
International Finance Corporation (IFC)
International Fund for Agricultural Development (IFAD)
International Labour Organization (ILO)
International Maritime Organization (IMO)
International Monetary Fund (IMF)

International Olympic Committee (IOC)
International Red Cross and Red Crescent Movement (ICRM)
International Telecommunication Union (ITU)
Multilateral Investment Guarantee Agency (MIGA)
Nonaligned Movement (NAM)
Organisation for the Prohibition of Chemical Weapons (OPCW)
Organization of American States (OAS)
Organization of Eastern Caribbean States (OECS)
United Nations (UN)
United Nations Conference on Trade and Development (UNCTAD)
United Nations Educational, Scientific, and Cultural Organization (UNESCO)
United Nations Industrial Development Organization (UNIDO)
Universal Postal Union (UPU)
World Federation of Trade Unions (WFTU)
World Health Organization (WHO)
World Intellectual Property Organization (WIPO)
World Trade Organization (WTO)

Law and order in Saint Kitts and Nevis 

Law of Saint Kitts and Nevis
 Constitution of Saint Kitts and Nevis
 Crime in Saint Kitts and Nevis
 Human rights in Saint Kitts and Nevis
 LGBT rights in Saint Kitts and Nevis
 Freedom of religion in Saint Kitts and Nevis
 Law enforcement in Saint Kitts and Nevis

Military of Saint Kitts and Nevis 

Military of Saint Kitts and Nevis
 Command
 Commander-in-chief:
 Ministry of Defence of Saint Kitts and Nevis
 Forces
 Army of Saint Kitts and Nevis
 Navy of Saint Kitts and Nevis
 Air Force of Saint Kitts and Nevis
 Special forces of Saint Kitts and Nevis
 Military history of Saint Kitts and Nevis
 Military ranks of Saint Kitts and Nevis

Local government in Saint Kitts and Nevis 

Local government in Saint Kitts and Nevis

History of Saint Kitts and Nevis 

History of Saint Kitts and Nevis
Timeline of the history of Saint Kitts and Nevis
Current events of Saint Kitts and Nevis
 Military history of Saint Kitts and Nevis

Culture of Saint Kitts and Nevis 

Culture of Saint Kitts and Nevis
 Architecture of Saint Kitts and Nevis
 Cuisine of Saint Kitts and Nevis
 Festivals in Saint Kitts and Nevis
 Languages of Saint Kitts and Nevis
 Media in Saint Kitts and Nevis
 National symbols of Saint Kitts and Nevis
 Coat of arms of Saint Kitts and Nevis
 Flag of Saint Kitts and Nevis
 National anthem of Saint Kitts and Nevis
 People of Saint Kitts and Nevis
 Public holidays in Saint Kitts and Nevis
 Records of Saint Kitts and Nevis
 Religion in Saint Kitts and Nevis
 Christianity in Saint Kitts and Nevis
 Hinduism in Saint Kitts and Nevis
 Islam in Saint Kitts and Nevis
 Judaism in Saint Kitts and Nevis
 Sikhism in Saint Kitts and Nevis
 World Heritage Sites in Saint Kitts and Nevis

Art in Saint Kitts and Nevis 
 Art in Saint Kitts and Nevis
 Cinema of Saint Kitts and Nevis
 Literature of Saint Kitts and Nevis
 Music of Saint Kitts and Nevis
 Television in Saint Kitts and Nevis
 Theatre in Saint Kitts and Nevis

Sports in Saint Kitts and Nevis 

Sports in Saint Kitts and Nevis
 Football in Saint Kitts and Nevis
 Saint Kitts and Nevis at the Olympics

Economy and infrastructure of Saint Kitts and Nevis 

Economy of Saint Kitts and Nevis
 Economic rank, by nominal GDP (2007): 176th (one hundred and seventy sixth)
 Agriculture in Saint Kitts and Nevis
 Banking in Saint Kitts and Nevis
 National Bank of Saint Kitts and Nevis
 Communications in Saint Kitts and Nevis
 Internet in Saint Kitts and Nevis
 Companies of Saint Kitts and Nevis
Currency of Saint Kitts and Nevis: Dollar
ISO 4217: XCD
 Energy in Saint Kitts and Nevis
 Energy policy of Saint Kitts and Nevis
 Oil industry in Saint Kitts and Nevis
 Mining in Saint Kitts and Nevis
 Tourism in Saint Kitts and Nevis
 Transport in Saint Kitts and Nevis
 Saint Kitts and Nevis Stock Exchange

Education in Saint Kitts and Nevis 

Education in Saint Kitts and Nevis

Infrastructure of Saint Kitts and Nevis
 Health care in Saint Kitts and Nevis
 Transportation in Saint Kitts and Nevis
 Airports in Saint Kitts and Nevis
 Rail transport in Saint Kitts and Nevis
 Roads in Saint Kitts and Nevis
 Water supply and sanitation in Saint Kitts and Nevis

See also 

Saint Kitts and Nevis
Index of Saint Kitts and Nevis-related articles
List of international rankings
List of Saint Kitts and Nevis-related topics
Member state of the Commonwealth of Nations
Member state of the United Nations
Monarchy of Saint Kitts and Nevis
Outline of geography
Outline of North America
Outline of the Caribbean

References

External links 

 Government
 St. Kitts & Nevis – Government of Saint Kitts and Nevis official website
 Ministry of Finance – of the Saint Kitts & Nevis Federation
 Nevis Ministry of Finance – for the Nevis Island Administration

 Directories
 SKNVibes.com Online
  StKittsNevis.com

 Sport
 St. Kitts & Nevis Billiard Federation – SKNBF Governing Body for cue sports — Official Site

 Tourism
Tour St. Kitts – Grey's Island Excursions; Local tour guide(Island tour,Volcano,Rainforest,Beach Trips

Saint Kitts Tourism Authority – Official Site
The Nevis Tourism Authority – Official Site
 St. Kitts Music Festival – Official Website of the annual Music Festival

 Other
Human Development Report 2006
St. Kitts Anglican Churches
Hosted at the University of the West Indies – Articles and materials on Nevis secession
Windsor University School of Medicine
St.Kitts Paper Money
 Map of St. Kitts
 Map of Nevis
 Google Maps satellite photo of Saint Kitts and Nevis

 1
Saint Kitts and Nevis